Le rose di Danzica (internationally released as The Roses of Danzig) is an Italian war-drama film directed by Alberto Bevilacqua, that was released theatrically in December 1979  and was later broadcast in a longer version in 1981 on Rai 2.  It is based on Bevilaqua's own novel with the same name.

Cast
 Franco Nero: General Konrad von Der Berg
 Helmut Berger: Baron Erich von Lehner
 Olga Karlatos: Margarethe
 Eleonora Vallone: Jutta
 Franco Javarone: Klaus von Knobelsdorf
 Macha Méril: Elvira von Lehner
 Roberto Posse: Herbert von Lehner
 Franco Ressel: priest

References

External links
 

1979 films
Italian television films
Films directed by Alberto Bevilacqua
Italian war drama films
Films based on Italian novels
1979 drama films
Films set in Germany
Films set in 1919
Films scored by Luis Bacalov
1980s Italian films
1970s Italian films